Ian Daniel Patterson (born 4 April 1973) is an English former professional footballer who played as a central defender.

Born in Chatham, Kent, Patterson started his career at Sunderland before moving to Burnley on a free transfer at the start of the 1993–94 season. He debuted against Bristol Rovers in September 1993, but did not make another appearance for the first team. He moved to Wigan Athletic in March 1994, making four appearances before being released at the end of the season.

References

1973 births
Living people
Sportspeople from Chatham, Kent
Footballers from Kent
English footballers
Association football defenders
Sunderland A.F.C. players
Burnley F.C. players
Wigan Athletic F.C. players
Stalybridge Celtic F.C. players
English Football League players